Nicolae Dudău (born 19 December 1945) is a Moldovan politician and was the former Minister of Foreign Affairs of Moldova.

Early life and career 
He was born on December 19, 1945 in Grinăuți, Edineț County, in the Moldovan SSR. He graduated from the Sergey Lazo Polytechnic Institute in Chișinău as a mechanical engineer in 1975. He also is an alumni and the Higher School of Party in Moscow in 1982, where he studied political studies. In 1963–1975, Dudău performed various technical functions at the Tractor Enterprise of Chșinău. Since 1975, he has become a political activist in different Party's bodies and state organs of the Republic of Moldova: Head of Section of the District Committee, Instructor of the Central Committee and Head of Section at the Central Committee. From 1988 to 1990 he was the Deputy Chairman of the State Planning Committee of the Moldovan SSR. From 1990 to 1991, he was the First Secretary of the Chișinău City Committee of the Communist Party of Moldova and finally Executive Director of the International Charity Association.

In 1993–1994, he served as the Counselor at the Embassy of Moldova in Russia, and then, in 1994, became the ambassador of Moldova to Uzbekistan, Tajikistan and Kyrgyzstan for concurrent positions. In 1997, Dudău was appointed the First Deputy Minister of Foreign Affairs of Moldova. He was appointed the Moldovan Ambassador to Belarus, Latvia, Lithuania and Estonia on 29 September 1998. On 3 September 2001, by decree of President Vladimir Voronin, Nicolae Dudău was appointed the Minister of Foreign Affairs in the first government of Vasile Tarlev. On 12 June 2002, he was given the diplomatic rank of ambassador. On 4 February 2004, he resigned from the position of  the minister, and 5 days later, Dudău was appointed as Ambassador of Moldova to Italy, a position he still holds to this day.

Personal life 
He is currently married and has one daughter. Apart of his native language of Moldovan, he also speaks English and Russian.

References 

 

Living people
1945 births
Ambassadors of Moldova to Italy
Foreign ministers of Moldova